China Railway Harbin Group, officially abbreviated as CR Harbin or CR-Harbin, formerly, Harbin Railway Administration is a subsidiaries company under the jurisdiction of the China Railway (formerly the Ministry of Railway). It supervises the railway network within Heilongjiang, and eastern Inner Mongolia. The railway administration was reorganized as a company in November 2017.

Hub stations
 Harbin
 , 
 Qiqihar
 , 
 Mudanjiang
 
 Jiamusi

Routes
 K265/266 Beijing-Jiamusi Through Train
 K339/340 Beijing-Jiamusi Through Train
 K7001/7002 Harbin-Mudanjiang Through Train
 K7031/7032 Harbin-Suihua Through Train
 K7047/7048 Harbin-Mudanjiang Through Train
 K7051/7052 Harbin-Daqing Through Train
 K7203/7204 Harbin-Jiamusi Through Train

References

Rail transport in Heilongjiang
China Railway Corporation